The single-window system or single-window concept  is a trade facilitation concept which allows an international (cross-border) trader to submit information to a single agency, rather than having to deal with multiple agencies in multiple locations to obtain the necessary papers, permits, and clearances to complete their import or export processes. There is an obvious time saving benefit to the single window system. The concept is recognised by organisations such as the United Nations Economic Commission for Europe (UNECE) and its Centre for Trade Facilitation and Electronic Business (UN/CEFACT), World Customs Organization (WCO), the United Nations Network of Experts for Paperless Trade and Transport in Asia and the Pacific (UNNExT), and the Association of Southeast Asian Nations (ASEAN).

Concept 

The main value proposition for having a single window for a country or economy is to increase the efficiency through time and cost savings for traders in their dealings with government authorities for obtaining the relevant clearance and permit(s) for moving cargoes across national or economic borders. In a traditional pre-single-window environment, traders may have had to contend with visits and dealings with multiple government agencies in multiple locations to obtain the necessary papers, permits, and clearances to complete their import or export processes.

A common definition of the term "single window" is:

"A facility that allows parties involved in trade and transport to lodge standardized information and documents with a single entry point to fulfill all import, export, and transit-related regulatory requirements. If information is electronic then individual data elements should only be submitted once."
The concept is recognised and promoted by several world organisations that are concerned with trade facilitation. Amongst these are the United Nations Economic Commission for Europe (UNECE) and its Centre for Trade Facilitation and Electronic Business (UN/CEFACT), World Customs Organization (WCO), the United Nations Network of Experts for Paperless Trade and Transport in Asia and the Pacific (UNNExT), and the Association of Southeast Asian Nations (ASEAN).

 Singapore, Sweden, the USA and New Zealand currently have Single Window systems in place.

The diagram below illustrates an example of an implementation of a Single Window system within a country or economy.

There are many actors and procedures required for international trade which may result in high costs and long waits. The reason why international trade needs practical support relatively more than domestic trade is the need for the inevitable controls of cross border regulatory Agencies (CBRAs).

These inevitable various controls can be carried out through the Single Window system, supported by information technology, and is an optimized process. A Single Window's benefits are shown in the following two diagrams, exemplifying trade with and without a Single Window:

Benefits
A single window service aims to deliver specific benefits to the main communities and stakeholders in cross-border trade:

 Government
 Customs
 Permit-issuing agencies
 Ministries (and other trade monitoring bodies) may be able to obtain cross-border trade-related data and statistics in a comprehensive and timely manner from the single window service provider
 Shipping and forwarding community
 Ship arrival notice
 IMO FAL forms:
 General declaration
 Cargo declaration
 Ship's stores declaration
 Crew's effects declaration
 Crew list
 Passenger list declaration
 Dangerous Goods
 Electronic ship clearance
 Shippers and traders
 Banking and insurance community

United Kingdom
The UK Government has committed £180 million to build a UK Single Trade Window, intending that "this will reduce the cost of trade by streamlining trader interactions with border agencies". The proposal forms part of the government's 2025 UK Border Strategy, reflecting an ambition that the UK Border should be "the most effective in the world" in regard to both prosperity and security. The proposal is expected to benefit small and medium sized organisations in particular.

References

External links
UNECE brochure on the Single Window concept
UN/CEFACT Recommendation No. 33 – Recommendation and Guidelines on establishing a Single Window
Ten Years of Single Window Implementation: Lessons learned for the future
The World Customs Organisation (WCO) perspective on the Single Window Concept

Business terms
Customs duties